Litchfield is a municipality in the Outaouais region, part of the Pontiac Regional County Municipality, Quebec, Canada. It is located on the shores of the eastern channel of the Ottawa River at Calumet Island.

Its settlements include Vinton (once known as St-Elizabeth-de-Franktown) and Goldwin. Notable lakes include Litchfield, Leslie, and Ours (Bear) Lakes.

History
Litchfield Township (spelled "Licthfield" on the Gale and Duberger map of 1795) was officially created in 1834. It was probably named after Lichfield, an English town in Staffordshire, north of Birmingham. On November 20, 1846, the township was incorporated with Alfred Lancaster as its first mayor. It was abolished the next year and became part of the Ottawa County Municipality. It was reestablished in 1855.

In 1863, the Municipality of Portage-du-Fort Village separated from Litchfield's territory, followed by Bryson in 1873, and by Campbell's Bay in 1904. Because Bryson was located in the narrowest part of the municipality, between L'Île-du-Grand-Calumet and Clarendon, it separated the municipality's territory in two.

In 1964, the Pontiac County Council (now Pontiac MRC) built its headquarters in Litchfield on Quebec Route 148 at the edge of Campbell's Bay.

On November 6, 2004, the Township Municipality of Litchfield changed its status to become the Municipality of Litchfield.

Demographics

Population

Language
Mother tongue (2021):
 English as first language: 64.0%
 French as first language: 33.0%
 English and French as first language: 3.0%
 Other languages: 1.0%

Local government
List of former mayors:
Michael McCrank (2001–2013)
Colleen Larivière (2013–present)

See also
 List of municipalities in Quebec

References

External links

Incorporated places in Outaouais
Municipalities in Quebec